Chelsea is a municipality located immediately north of Gatineau, Quebec, Canada, and about  north of Ottawa.  Chelsea is located within Canada's National Capital Region. It is the seat of Les Collines-de-l'Outaouais Regional County Municipality.

Its population was 8000 in the 2021 Canadian Census. The population of Chelsea is almost evenly divided between anglophones and francophones, with both official languages being spoken in roughly 70% of households.

While 60% of the area consists of Gatineau Park, much of the rest of Chelsea is residential.

A sports complex, the Meredith Centre, was developed in 2012, neighboring Chelsea Elementary School. The complex hosts a hockey rink, community rooms, and soccer fields. The mayor of Chelsea, QC is Pierre Guénard.

Part of the film Grey Owl was shot on the Gatineau River. A number of regionally and nationally well-known musicians, filmmakers, and artists live in Chelsea, including Ian Tamblyn.

Geography
Chelsea is a roughly triangle-shaped municipality that includes much of the southern and eastern parts of Gatineau Park, and is bordered on the east by the Gatineau River. Beyond Farm Point lies the municipality of La Pêche and the village of Wakefield. North of Old Chelsea is Camp Fortune, a popular alpine ski club 15 minutes from Downtown Ottawa.

Communities
Kingsmere
Chelsea
Old Chelsea
Larrimac
Farm Point
Hollow Glen

History
Chelsea is named after the Vermont town of its first settler, Thomas Brigham, who was a partner and son-in-law of Philemon Wright and arrived there in 1819. The name has been in use since the early 19th century: Old Chelsea (1819), Parish Saint-Stephen-of-Chelsea (1835), Chelsea (circa 1870). In 1875, the municipality was established as Hull-Partie-Ouest, or commonly referred to as West Hull. The municipality was renamed to its current name in 1990.

During World War II, the Royal Canadian Navy wanted to understand more about the propagation of radio waves and how they were affected by the earth's ionosphere so that German radio transmissions could be intercepted more efficiently. In cooperation with the National Research Council, the RCN established a "field intensity station" at  Chelsea in 1941 to monitor the height of the ionosphere.

Chelsea, also known as an ionospheric observatory, was established in 1941 and closed down in 1947. It was located on the north side of Old Chelsea Road a few hundred yards west of Highway 105. The Chelsea station operated during the post-war period but in 1947, its work was transferred to the Defence  Research Board's new Radio Propagation Laboratory in Ottawa. Shortly thereafter, the station was demolished. Today, there are no traces of the single shack or the many masts that were once erected on the property.

Demographics

Mother tongue:
 English as first language: 43.1%
 French as first language: 46.3%
 English and French as first language: 3.9%
 Other as first language: 5.6%

Transportation 
Autoroute 5, also known as the Autoroute de la Gatineau, is a major freeway that connects Chelsea and La Pêche with Gatineau and Ottawa.

Public transportation is provided to the region by Transcollines, with bus routes 921, 922, 923, 924, and 925 connecting the regional county municipality with Gatineau as of 2022. During summer weekends, the Societé de Transport de l'Outaouais provides free shuttle buses through Gatineau Park that terminate at the Gatineau Park Visitors Centre in Old Chelsea.

Gallery

See also 

 List of municipalities in Quebec
 Camp Fortune
 Chemin de fer de l'Outaouais
 Gatineau River Yacht Club
 Hull-Chelsea-Wakefield Railway
 Ryan Tower

References

 Official Transport Quebec Road Map

External links

Municipality of Chelsea Website

 
Incorporated places in Outaouais
Municipalities in Quebec
National Capital Region (Canada)